John Dubetz (1916-2002) was a politician from Alberta, Canada. He served in the Legislative Assembly of Alberta from 1959 to 1963 as a member of the Social Credit caucus in government.

Political career
Dubetz ran for a seat to the Alberta Legislature in the 1959 Alberta general election as a Social Credit candidate in the electoral district of Redwater.  He defeated incumbent Liberal MLA Alfred Macyk and future Senator Martha Bielish with just under half of the popular vote to pick up the district for his party.  He retired at dissolution of the assembly in 1963.

References

External links
Legislative Assembly of Alberta Members Listing

Alberta Social Credit Party MLAs
1916 births
2002 deaths
People from Smoky Lake County